Garrett Graham (born August 4, 1986) is a former American football tight end. He played college football at Wisconsin and was drafted by the Houston Texans in the fourth round of the 2010 NFL draft.

Early years
Graham attended Brick Memorial High School in Brick Township, New Jersey. He was a tight end, defensive end, punter and kicker. He finished with 96 receptions for 2,031 yards and 21 touchdowns. He also was first-team all state 2 years in a row.

College career
After being redshirted in 2005, Graham played in three games as a redshirt freshman in 2006 but did not have a reception. As a sophomore in 2007, Graham started 10 of 13 games recording 30 receptions for 328 yards and four touchdowns. As a junior in 2008, Graham started 10 of 11 games. He finished the season leading the team in receptions with 40, receiving yards with 540 and touchdowns with five.

Garrett finished his senior season with 51 receptions for 624 yards and seven touchdowns which led the team.

On November 23, 2009, Garrett Graham was selected 1st Team All-Big Ten tight end by the media and 2nd team by the coaches.

Receiving

Professional career

2010 NFL Draft

Houston Texans
Graham was selected in the fourth round with the 118th overall pick by the Houston Texans.

After seeing limited action in his first two seasons, Graham became the second-string tight end in the 2012 season. In week 11 against the Jacksonville Jaguars, Graham set career highs in receptions (8), yards (82), and touchdowns (2) in the 43–37 overtime win.

On March 13, 2014, Graham re-signed with the Texans on a three-year contract.

Denver Broncos
On April 25, 2016 Graham signed with the Denver Broncos.

On September 15, 2016 Graham was released by Denver due to a shoulder injury.

Receiving

References

External links
Houston Texans bio
Wisconsin Badgers bio

1986 births
Living people
Brick Memorial High School alumni
Sportspeople from Brick Township, New Jersey
Players of American football from New Jersey
American football tight ends
American football fullbacks
Wisconsin Badgers football players
Houston Texans players
Denver Broncos players
Sportspeople from Ocean County, New Jersey